

Deceased members

 Mohammad Ali Jinnah, (1876) founder and first Governor General of Pakistan
 S. T. Desai, (1927) Chief Justice of Gujarat and Senior Advocate, Supreme Court of India
 Sir Muhammad Iqbal (Allama Iqbal), (1877) Muslim poet, philosopher and National poet of Pakistan
 H. H. Asquith, (1852) Prime Minister of the United Kingdom and 1st Earl of Oxford and Asquith
 Mirza Hameedullah Beg, (1913) Chief Justice of India
 Richard Bellewe, (1575) legal reporter
 Sir Thomas Berkeley, M.P.
 Kader Bhayat, Minister of Commerce in Mauritius 
 Zulfiqar Ali Bhutto, 4th President and 11th Prime Minister of Pakistan
 Henry Buckley, 1st Baron Wrenbury, (1854) a PC and QC who wrote the first edition of Buckley on the Companies Act. He served as a Judge of the High Court of Justice and as a Lord Justice of Appeal. He was then admitted to the Privy Council and elevated to the peerage as Baron Wrenbury
 Richard Cromwell (1626)
 Barun De, (Matriculation: 1954), Chairman, West Bengal Heritage Commission
 Rauf Raif Denktas (1924) Founding President of the illegal and not recognised by the UN, Turkish Republic of Northern Cyprus
 Lord Denning (1899)
 Sir Maurice Drake DFC (1923)
 John Donne (1572)
 Sir John Fortescue,(1394) Lord Chief Justice under King Henry VI of England and jurist
 Monomohun Ghose, (1844) the first Indian to practice at the Calcutta High Court
 Sir Padamji Ginwala (1897) Parsi Barrister and economist from India
 William Ewart Gladstone, (1809) four times Prime Minister of the United Kingdom
 Lord Hailsham of St Marylebone, (1907) former Lord Chancellor
 William Hakewill, M.P., lawyer and antiquary (1574)
 Chaim Herzog, (1918) sixth President of Israel
 Mohammad Hidayatullah, (1905) Chief Justice of India.
 Makhdoom Khusro Bakhtiar, former minister of planning development & special reforms, minister of national food security of Pakistan, minister of economic affairs of Pakistan
 Sir Muhammad Zafarullah Khan, (1893) Foreign Minister of Pakistan
 Sir Baron Jayatilaka, (1868) Minister for Home Affairs, Ceylon 
 Javed Iqbal (Judge) , Senior Judge Supreme Court of Pakistan
 Mithan Jamshed Lam, (1898) the first Indian woman Barrister, former Sheriff of Mumbai and Padma Bhushan awardee
 Thomas Langlois Lefroy (1776), Chief Justice of Ireland from 1855 to 1866
 Sir Thomas More (1478)
 John Henry Newman, cardinal (1801)
 William Osgoode, (1754) first Chief Justice of Ontario after whom Osgoode Hall (and by proxy Osgoode Hall Law School) was named
 Apa Saheb Bala Saheb Pant, Indian freedom fighter and diplomat
  Sir James Peiris, (1856) the first elected head of the Legislative Council of Ceylon
 William Pitt the Younger, twice Prime Minister of the United Kingdom (1759)
 Thomas Powys (1794) who was the 2nd Baron Lilford
 William Prynne, 17th century pamphleteer and opponent of Archbishop William Laud (1600)
 Francis Rogers, (1791) judge and author
 William Roper (1496)
 Subimal Chandra Roy, (1971) Judge of the Supreme Court of India.
 Shankar Dayal Sharma, (1918) 9th President of The Republic of India
 Hon. Kenneth George Smith, Chief Justice of Jamaica (1973-1984)
 Sir Nicholas Steward, (1618) 1st Baronet of Hartley Mauditt, MP Lymington, Justice of the Peace (1660) and Deputy Lieutenant of Hampshire (1673 to 1688), Chamberlain of the Exchequer
 Gnanendramohan Tagore, first Asian to be called at the bar
 Margaret Thatcher, former Prime Minister of the United Kingdom
 Sir Nicholas Conyngham Tindal (1776), Chief Justice of the Common Pleas
Edward Vernon Utterson (c. 1776), lawyer, one of the Six Clerks in Chancery, literary antiquary, collector and editor
 Sir Francis Walsingham (1532)
 Michael Mortimer Wheeler (1915–1992), QC and Deputy High Court Judge, elected Bencher (1967–) and Treasurer (1986–) of the Inn
 William Wingfield (MP), Chief Justice of the Brecon Circuit (1772)
 Sir Anerood Jugnauth, former Prime Minister and President of Mauritius

Living members
 Hammad Azhar, Member of National Assembly of Pakistan from Lahore, Former Federal Minister for Economic Affairs, Current Federal Minister for Industries and Production. 
 Asaduddin Owaisi, Member Of Indian Parliament from Hyderabad, And President of All India Majlis-e-Ittehadul Muslimeen
 Ahmed Ebrahim, justice of the Zimbabwe and Swaziland supreme courts
 Azlan Shah of Perak, former Lord President of Malaysia, Sultan of Perak Darul Ridzuan
 Basdeo Panday, Fifth Prime Minister of Trinidad and Tobago and first Indo-Trinidadian Prime Minister of Trinidad and Tobago
 Sajjad Ali Shah, Chief Justice Of Pakistan
 Adnan Sami, World Famous  Singer, Musician and Pianist
 Dr. Kamal Hossain, former Foreign and Law Minister of Bangladesh.
 Muhammad Jamiruddin Sircar, former Acting President, Former Speaker, Minister for Law, Justice and Parliamentary Affairs, Bangladesh
 Chan Sek Keong, former Chief Justice of Singapore.
 Robert Walker, Baron Walker of Gestingthorpe, former Justice of the Supreme Court of the United Kingdom
 Martin Lee, Hong Kong politician. Former leader of the Democratic Party
 Andrew Cheung, incumbent Chief Judge of the High Court of Hong Kong
 John Kufuor, President of Ghana from 2001 to 2009
 Charles Gray QC
 Mary Arden (judge), Lady Justice of Appeal of the Royal Courts of Justice
 David Neuberger, Baron Neuberger of Abbotsbury, former President of the Supreme Court of the United Kingdom 
 Tony Blair, former Prime Minister of the United Kingdom
 Khalid Jawed Khan, Attorney General of Pakistan
 Makhdoom Ali Khan, former Attorney General of Pakistan
 Cherie Booth QC
 Raja Ashman Shah, Raja Kecil Tengah of Perak Darul Ridzuan (Malaysia)
 Rabinder Singh QC
 Ghulam Muhammad Khan Bhurgri, Pioneer of Pakistan Freedom Movement, first Barrister from Sindh
 Ajmal Mian, Barrister and Former Chief Justice of Pakistan
Asif Saeed Khan Khosa, Senior Puisne Judge Supreme Court of Pakistan
Miangul Hassan Aurangzeb, Justice Islamabad High Court
Liong Siew Hong (Isabel Liong), Award-Winning Mandarin Writer, Former Chief Editor of The Malayan Law Journal and The Malaysian Corporate and Commercial Law Review

See also
List of members of Gray's Inn
List of members of Middle Temple

References

Members of Lincoln's Inn
Bar of England and Wales